Natalia Isabel Escalera Cárdenas (born July 3, 2002) is a Mexican artistic gymnast.  She is the 2021 Pan American champion on vault.

Early life
Escalera was born in Ensenada in 2002 and began gymnastics when she was three years old.

Gymnastics career

Junior

2017
At the 2017 Mexican national championships Escalera finished third in the all-around in the junior division.  At the Central American Sports Festival she finished seventh in the all-around and second on vault.

Senior

2018–19 
Escalera turned senior in 2018.  She finished sixth at her first senior-level national championships.  Due to her strong vaulting, she was selected to represent Mexico at the 2018 Pan American Championships.  While there she helped Mexico finish third.

At the 2019 Mexican Championships Escalera placed twelfth.

2021
Escalera returned to competition at the 2021 Pan American Championships where she helped Mexico place second and individually she placed fifth in the all-around and was the highest placing Mexican gymnast.  She qualified to three event finals, originally finishing second on vault behind Martina Dominici, fifth on uneven bars, and fifth on floor exercise.  However, it was later revealed that Dominici had tested positive for a banned substance; as a result her results were overturned and Escalera was awarded the gold medal on vault.

At the World Championships Escalera qualified to the vault final where she placed seventh.

2022
Escalera competed at the 2022 Pan American Championships where she helped Mexico place fourth as a team and qualify for the upcoming World Championships.  Individually she won silver on vault behind Karla Navas of Panama.

Competitive history

References

External links
 

2002 births
Living people
Mexican female artistic gymnasts
Sportspeople from Baja California
People from Ensenada, Baja California
21st-century Mexican women